Sciphone is a brand of cellular phone associated with a Chinese telecom company called Bluelans Communications which produces imitation mobile phones using the designs of major brands of mobile phones. These phones are usually low priced. For example, it produced counterfeit devices that were very similar to Apple's iPhone and featured its basic functionalities.

The phones are available throughout the Internet, on major websites such as eBay and Alibaba, which are usually shipped from Hong Kong or Mainland China, while some have been known to ship from Singapore. In addition to being available online, the phones can commonly be found in Shanzhai-based marketplaces in China with various being rare to find. These marketplaces have emerged as a culture in China, implying not only banditry but also a form of rebellion and the lack of state control. For some observers, Sciphone is part of the rip-off products that came to represent the people's resistance to the dominant cultural values in the country.

The phones have found repute and intrigue in major technology blogs, such as Gizmodo and Engadget, where they are usually labeled as KIRF or counterfeit. Sciphone devices are usually found running MediaTek's MAUI, however many newer models, such as the Sciphone N12, N16, N17, N19, and N21, are running Android 1.5.

References

External links

Official Bluelans Communications site
Sciphone Reviews- News, information and reviews about Sciphone phones.

Mobile phones by company
Counterfeit consumer goods